Marcilly-sur-Seine (literally Marcilly on Seine) is a commune in the Marne department in north-eastern France. It is near the confluence of the Aube and the Seine.

See also
Communes of the Marne department

References

Marcillysurseine